When the Party's Over is a 1993 film directed by Matthew Irmas and starring Sandra Bullock. It was first released on March 12, 1993.

Plot
Frankie (Elizabeth Berridge), Amanda (Sandra Bullock), MJ (Rae Dawn Chong), and Banks (Kris Kamm) are housemates, who are fresh out of college.

Frankie is a social worker, who is dating Taylor, a lawyer (Brian McNamara).

Amanda, an artist, meets and falls in love with Alexander Midnight, a performance artist (Fisher Stevens). She is also trying to guide her younger brother, Willie (Michael Landes), with wisdom, patience, and compassion, after the death of their mother.

The third roommate, MJ, is a stockbroker, who is actually very promiscuous and has a penchant for drinking. She even sleeps with Taylor, thus betraying Frankie.

The final housemate, Banks, is an actor who is gay, and who is also best friends with Amanda.

In short, this movie touches on a group of twentysomethings in California, circa the early 1990s, highlighting the social issues of that time period, like excessive drinking, homosexuality, rape, infidelity, and problems with trust, amongst many other themes.

Cast
 Sandra Bullock as Amanda
 Rae Dawn Chong as M.J.
 Kris Kamm as Banks
 Fisher Stevens as  Alexander Midnight
 Elizabeth Berridge as Frankie
 Brian McNamara as Taylor
 Paul Johansson as  Henry
 Michael Landes as  Willie
 Raymond Cruz as  Mario

Reception
Critical reception for When the Party's Over was mostly positive, and Allmovie rated the film at three stars. The Los Angeles Times was more positive, writing that it "transcends the conventional plot and brings the characters alive in this engaging tale of struggling housemates."

References

External links
 

1993 films
1993 comedy-drama films
American comedy-drama films
1990s English-language films
1990s American films